Holly Park may refer to:

Place names:
 Holly Park, Ontario, a hamlet within the township of King, Ontario
 Holly Park, California, a place in Los Angeles County, California
 Holly Park, New Jersey, an unincorporated community 
Holly Park (San Francisco), a park in San Francisco, California
 Holly Park, Seattle, Washington, the former name of NewHolly, a neighborhood in the Beacon Hill district of the city
 Holly Park, a former stadium of South Liverpool F.C. in Garston, Merseyside
 Holly Park, a municipal park in the Bernal Heights neighborhood of San Francisco, California
 Holly Park, the former name of Priory, a house in Rathfarnham, a southside suburb of Dublin, Ireland

Other uses:
 "Holly Park", a song on the album The American Dream by Emitt Rhodes

See also 
 Holly Recreation Area, a state-run park near Holly, Michigan